Problematic Men is a South Korean television program that airs on tvN, and currently stars Jun Hyun-moo, Kim Ji-seok,  (Peppertones), Ha Seok-jin, Joo Woo-jae and . It currently airs on Thursdays at 20:00 (KST).

The program went on hiatus after its broadcast on March 25, 2018. On May 9, 2018, it was announced that the program would be returning as Season 2 from May 29, 2018 and would air on every Tuesday at 23:00 (KST), with no change in the current cast lineup. Beginning January 7, 2019 the program airs on Mondays at 23:00 (KST).

The program was on another hiatus after its broadcast on June 10, 2019 as the program was replaced by More Salty Tour in its current time slot, and it is slated to return in the second half of 2019. On October 28, 2019 tvN confirmed the program will return as Season 3 starting November 21, 2019, with original cast members Tyler Rasch and Park Kyung (Block B) not returning. Plus, model Joo Woo-jae and YouTuber/entrepreneur  will join the cast as new members.

The program is said to be currently on indefinite hiatus as of February 13, 2020, due to the COVID-19 pandemic in South Korea, which made filming of the program difficult.

Program
It is a talk show variety program that focuses on various types of questions every week, sometimes with a theme. The cast invited for this program are 6 males, that have been labelled as "men with hot brains".

Traditionally, the cast is given clues to guess the identity of the episode's guest(s), and once the guest appears and are introduced, they and the cast are given a set of questions to solve. It is a tradition that all questions for the episode must be solved before the whole recording of the episode would end.

Season 3 features the theme of Brain Wanderers Squad/Travelling Brainiacs, where the cast goes outdoors, unlike most of the previous 2 seasons when they were in the studio. The 6 cast members travel to various places around South Korea, varying from campuses to companies. For each place, the members would be split into 2 teams of 3 to look for people who they think are hidden brainiacs in the place and each team selects one to join, and the 2 teams go against each other in a battle of problem solving. The winning team can get off work on time, while the losing team has to stay in the campus to study after filming for the show is complete.

Airtime

Cast

Current
 Jun Hyun-moo (Ep 1-224)
 Kim Ji-seok (Ep 1-224; absent in episodes 174, 179-198)
 Lee Jang-won (Peppertones) (Ep 1-224; absent in episodes 135, 174)
 Ha Seok-jin (Ep 1-224; absent in episode 174)
 Joo Woo-jae (Ep 212-224)
  (Ep 212-224)

Former
 RM (BTS) (Ep 1-21)
 Tyler Rasch (Ep 1-211; absent in episodes 37-39, 56, 72, 145-148, 163-164, 174)
 Park Kyung (Block B) (Ep 25-211; absent in episodes 37-39, 77, 145, 149, 174, 205)

Episodes

2015

2016

2017

2018

2019

2020 

Note: This program airs on a cable channel/pay TV which normally has a relatively smaller audience compared to free-to-air TV/public broadcasters.

Awards and nominations

Notes

References

External links
 

2015 South Korean television series debuts
2020s South Korean television series
Korean-language television shows
TVN (South Korean TV channel) original programming
South Korean variety television shows
Television productions suspended due to the COVID-19 pandemic